Camerana is a comune (municipality) in the Province of Cuneo in the Italian region Piedmont, located about  southeast of Turin and about  east of Cuneo.

Camerana borders the following municipalities: Gottasecca, Mombarcaro, Monesiglio, Montezemolo, Sale delle Langhe, Sale San Giovanni, and Saliceto.

References

Cities and towns in Piedmont